Pembroke Athleta Football Club are a Maltese football club from the town of Pembroke, which currently plays in the Maltese National Amateur League.
Originally they were founded in 1962 but they were in an amateur level. They competed in the  Maltese Third Division in 1994 for the first time.

Pembroke Athleta reached the Premier League for the first time in 2015.

History

1962: Founded as Athleta Juvenis
1994: Debuted in Maltese Third Division and renamed Pembroke Athleta F.C
1996: Maltese Third Division (Section B) Winners
1998: Maltese Third and Second Division Knock-Out Runners Up
2012: Maltese Third Division Champions
2014: Maltese Second Division Runners Up
2015: Maltese First Division Champions

2011–12 season

A game of note for the club was when  Pembroke were drawn against giants Hibernians in the Maltese FA Trophy.  Pembroke went into half time with a shock score of 2–2 courtesy of goals from Matthew Borg and Lydon Cilia but during the second half, the endless attacks from Hibernians proved too much and despite some very good saves from Pembroke goalkeeper Rodrick Debattista and a perfectly executed goal from Pembroke Captain Carlo Leonardi, Pembroke eventually succumbed to Hibs and the game ended with the score at 5–3.  During the same season, Pembroke managed to clinch first place in the Maltese Third Division and promotion to the Maltese Second Division.  They finished in 1st place after managing to take 63 points from 26 games.

2012–13 season

Still led by Jacques Scerri, Pembroke prepared for their first season in the Maltese Second Division.  John Roland Emeka was the club's marquee signing, with the Nigerian striker arriving from recently relegated Senglea Athletic.  Other signings included Matthew Mulholland, Jonathan Vella, Michael Ellul, Kane Micallef and Nicholas Grima.  Pembroke started the season in incredible form, remaining unbeaten for the first 7 games, even topping the table at one point.  Things went a bit sour as the season reached December though and 3 consecutive losses without scoring cost the club.

In the end the team finished in 7th place, a solid mid-table position having won 12, drew 7 and lost 9 of their 26 games.  Throughout the season, the Greys scored a total of 42 goals and conceded 30, the best defensive record out of all the sides that did not clinch promotion.
John Roland Emeka proved his worth by ending the season as the club's top scorer with 14 goals.

In the Maltese FA Trophy, Pembroke once again managed to make their way into the Third Round, beating Gozitan side Xewkija Tigers 3–2.  In the Third Round, they were drawn against Premier League club Qormi FC.  Qormi in the end triumphed with a score of 5–2 which was obtained in extra time.  Like the previous year Pembroke had made a Premier League team (who would end the tournament as runners-up) struggle.

In the U-19 section of the club, the Youth team made history as they obtained the club's first ever promotion to Section B after finishing 1st with 34 points from 18 games.

2013–14 season

Following the departure of Jacques Scerri to Melita F.C., Vojko Martinovic, who had successfully led the club's U-17 section to promotion to the top division (Section A), was installed as the new manager of the team.  New signings for the team included Nicholas Zammit, Mauro Grioli, Mark Borg, Adrian Caruana, David Mamo, Aleksandar Ribic, Lee Grima, Roberto Vella, Dylan Mintoff and Michael Borg.  Carmelo Farrugia also returned from Qormi F.C. to spend another season on loan at the club.

The season began in impressive fashion as we remained unbeaten up until December, when we lost 1–0 to Marsaskala F.C.  Nonetheless, we powered on and eventually finished in 2nd place in the 2nd Division behind Mqabba, therefore gaining a historic promotion to the Maltese First Division for the first time in the club's history.  Nicholas Zammit finished the season as the club's top scorer with 13 goals.

The Youths Team was even more successful through the season as it managed an incredible promotion to the top of the Youth pyramid.  This mean that within four seasons, the U-19 Team had won its way from Section D all the way to Section A.  Even more incredibly, the team managed to dispatch some of the best youth teams on the island including Hibernians F.C., Mosta F.C., Ħamrun Spartans F.C. and Sliema Wanderers to win the Youth Knock-Out Competition.  The 1–0 victory against Sliema in the final made the team the first ever in the club's history to win the Trophy and also the first ever Section B team to triumph in this competition.

2014–15 season

The new season saw the return of an old face, as Jacques Scerri returned to the club with Greg Degabriele, Kenneth Portelli and later on in the season, Mario Muscat as part of the technical staff.  With the new staff came a host of new players namely Roderick Bajada, Ayrton Azzopardi, Ariel Laudisi, Andrea Cassar, Ousmane Sidibe, Carlo Mamo, Lucky Omerou and Abubaker Bello Osagie among others who joined long term club players such as Geoffrey Spiteri and Matthew Calleja Cremona.

Achievements

Maltese First Division: 2014–15
Maltese Third Division: 2011–12
Youth Knock-Out Trophy: 2013–14
Noel Muscat Cup: 2012

External links
Pemborke win the 2011/12 Third Division
Pembroke win Noel Muscat Cup
Hibs Overcome Pembroke

Association football clubs established in 1994
Football clubs in Malta
1994 establishments in Malta
Pembroke, Malta